Exotico was the third album released by the flamenco-influenced Latin guitar instrumental duo Lara & Reyes.

Track listing
"Exótico"  – 5:32
"Cascabeles (Rattlers)"  – 4:39
"Despertar (Awakening)"  – 4:51
"Bahia del Palmar (Palmer Bay)"  – 4:40
"Dulce Libertad (Sweet Freedom)"  – 5:29
"Morning Rain"  – 4:20
"Mi Ciudad (My City)"  – 6:41
"Katia's Dance"  – 5:47
"Falda de Jade (Jade Skirt)"  – 4:04
"Brazil"  – 5:45
"Guitarras Ardientes (Burning Guitars)"  – 6:16

References

1996 albums
Lara & Reyes albums
Higher Octave albums